The 1952 Missouri gubernatorial election was held on November 4, 1952 and resulted in a victory for the Democratic nominee, former Governor Phil M. Donnelly, over the Republican candidate, former Speaker of the Missouri House of Representatives Howard Elliott, and candidates representing the Progressive, Socialist and Socialist Labor parties. Donnelly defeated representative Phil J. Welch for his party's nomination.

Results

References

Gubernatorial
1952
Missouri
November 1952 events in the United States